Vojno is a village in the City of Mostar, Bosnia and Herzegovina.

Demographics 
According to the 2013 census, its population was 508.

See also 
Vojno camp

References

Populated places in Mostar
Villages in the Federation of Bosnia and Herzegovina